King Homestead, now called New Moon Farm, is a log home off Tennessee State Route 25 located near Cottontown, in Sumner County, Tennessee. It was built in 1798 by William King as the first home for himself and his new bride, Caroline Hassell. The home remained in the King family for one hundred years, before being sold. The home has undergone renovation and was placed on the National Register of Historic Places in 1978.

It was built originally as a single pen log house. In 1978 it was a two-story double pen with its front entrance into an enclosed former dogtrot.

References

Sumner County Fact Book 2007-2008. The News Examiner & The Hendersonville Star News. 2007.

Houses on the National Register of Historic Places in Tennessee
Houses completed in 1798
Houses in Sumner County, Tennessee
National Register of Historic Places in Sumner County, Tennessee